is the debut studio album by Swedish singer-songwriter Lars Winnerbäck, released in 1996. It has been certified gold in Sweden.

Track listing
"Tretton trappor opp" – 3:46 – 13 Floors Up
"Eldvakt" – 2:48 – Fire Watcher
"Av ingens frö" – 3:45 – By No One's Seed
"Fröken Svår" – 1:26 – Miss Difficult
"Under månen" – 5:14 – Under the Moon
"Tal av Hjärter Dam" – 2:22 – Speech from the Queen of Hearts
"Kom änglar" – 4:13 – Come Angels
"Julgröten" – 5:16 – The Christmas Porridge
"Sagan om en fantasi" – 3:59 – The Tale About a Fantasy
"Vårdag i november" – 4:02 – Spring Day in November
"Försvarstal" – 3:28 – Defense Speech
"Inte för kärleks skull" – 4:42 – Not for the Sake of Love
"Fenomena" – 4:02 – Phenomenon

Personnel
Lars Winnerbäck – vocals, acoustic guitar
P H Andersson – violin, recorder, electric guitar, acoustic guitar, backing vocals
Kalle Tagesson – piano
Martin Söderström – bass guitar
Johan Aronsson – drums, percussion
Rikard Favati – acoustic guitar (Av ingens frö)
Susanna Carlstedt – vocals (Av ingens frö)

References 

Lars Winnerbäck albums
1996 debut albums